Koumpounophobia is the term used to describe the phobia of clothes buttons. This phobia regularly leads to feelings of fear and disgust when sufferers are exposed to buttons either visually or physically. It is estimated that less than one percent of the U.S. suffers from this phobia. The most common forms of treatment for koumpounophobia are behavioral therapy and cognitive-behavioral therapy.

Notable koumpounophobes  

Steve Jobs, the co-founder of  Apple Inc., had an aversion to buttons, which manifested in a dislike for buttons on computer hardware and his choice to wear a turtleneck shirts instead of shirts with buttons. Some have speculated that this influenced the trend towards touchscreens and virtual keyboards in the design of Apple devices.

Koumpounophobia in popular culture 
In 2009, popular author Neil Gaiman released a promotional teaser trailer for the film Coraline, based on his novella. The trailer featured Gaiman addressing the nature of koumpounophobia and warning sufferers about the content of the film, which features characters with buttons in place of eyes.

References 

Phobias